In enzymology, a thiamine-phosphate kinase is an enzyme that catalyzes the chemical reaction

ATP + thiamine phosphate  ADP + thiamine diphosphate

Thus, the two substrates of this enzyme are ATP and thiamine phosphate, whereas its two products are ADP and thiamine diphosphate.

This enzyme belongs to the family of transferases, specifically those transferring phosphorus-containing groups (phosphotransferases) with a phosphate group as acceptor.  The systematic name of this enzyme class is ATP:thiamine-phosphate phosphotransferase. Other names in common use include thiamin-monophosphate kinase, thiamin monophosphatase, and thiamin monophosphokinase.  This enzyme participates in thiamine metabolism.

Structural studies

As of late 2007, only one structure has been solved for this class of enzymes, with the PDB accession code .

References 

 

EC 2.7.4
Enzymes of known structure